Salix foetida, the fishy willow, is a species of flowering plant in the family Salicaceae, native to the Alps, Pyrenees, and central Apennine Mountains of Europe.

References

foetida
Flora of France
Flora of Switzerland
Flora of Austria
Flora of Italy
Plants described in 1805